The Batman Adventures is a DC Comics comic book series featuring Batman. It is different from other Batman titles because it is set in the continuity (and style) of Batman: The Animated Series, as opposed to the regular DC Universe.

Overview
The Batman Adventures was created to tie-in with the Batman: The Animated Series. As the animated series changed with each successive re-branding and relaunch, so too did The Batman Adventures. It was originally conceived as a miniseries, but eventually got its status as tie-in.

The success of The Batman Adventures has also led to a set of "Adventures" titles mirroring the animated series that followed Batman: The Animated Series, including Superman Adventures (based on Superman: The Animated Series) and Justice League Adventures (based on Justice League).

The Batman Adventures (vol. 1, 1992–1995)
Based on Batman: The Animated Series, the first series ran for 36 issues, 2 annuals, and 3 specials (Mad Love and Holiday Special, which were both adapted into episodes for The New Batman Adventures, plus an adaptation of the Batman: Mask of the Phantasm movie). The first annual introduces Roxy Rocket, who would later appear in The New Batman Adventures episode "The Ultimate Thrill" and the Superman: The Animated Series episode "Knight Time". Most of the issues were written by Kelley Puckett, and illustrated by Mike Parobeck and Rick Burchett, though Ty Templeton did the writing and art on a few issues. Mad Love was written by Paul Dini and illustrated by Bruce Timm, while the holiday special was written and illustrated by a number of creative people who had worked on the animated series, including Paul Dini, Bruce Timm, Glen Murakami, Dan Riba, and Kevin Altieri.

The Batman and Robin Adventures (1995–1997)
Following the re-branding of the animated series as The Adventures of Batman and Robin, the comic series was relaunched. It ran for 25 issues and 2 annuals, as well as 2 specials (an adaptation of Batman & Mr. Freeze: SubZero; and Dark Claw Adventures, a non-canon Amalgam comic featuring the Batman-Wolverine hybrid). Ty Templeton was the regular writer, with Rick Burchett as the artist. However, according to colorist Rick Taylor, the series was cancelled before many planned stories could be published. Some of them included another Batgirl and Robin team up, Batman teaching a grieving widower the futility of vengeance, the origin of the Threatening Three and the first appearance of Anarky.

The Batman Adventures: The Lost Years (1998)
Shortly after The New Batman Adventures began airing on Kids WB!, DC Comics published a five issue miniseries titled The Batman Adventures: The Lost Years. This series bridged the gap between the end of Batman: The Animated Series and the start of the new show. Additionally, the first two issues were adapted from the episode "Old Wounds," and issues #4 and the end of issue #5 were adaptations of the episode "Sins of the Father".

Book One: Robin (Dick Grayson) voices his disapproval regarding Batman's tolerance of the crime-fighting activities of the relatively untrained Batgirl and takes it upon himself to stop her. Subsequently, Batman deduces that Batgirl is actually Barbara Gordon while watching her play tennis against Dick – he realizes that she moves just like Batgirl. Batman decides to take Batgirl under his wing and give her the training she needs. Robin is upset by this decision and argues with Batman, but refuses to change his mind.

Book Two: Bruce and Dick continue their argument up through Dick's college graduation ceremony. When the Joker unleashes a radar jammer that can cause aircraft to crash, Batman and Batgirl battle him and his gang before Dick, as Robin, intervenes. The Joker is defeated, but Dick is so enraged at Batman, for putting Batgirl in danger and not telling him that she was Barbara, that he punches him and storms away. He decides to leave Gotham City, despite the protests of Alfred and Barbara.

Book Three: Dick breaks up a smuggling operation by Two-Face and discovers an ancient African tribe, where he learns combat techniques from them, finally taking the first steps out of Batman's shadow. In Africa, Dick develops a new persona for himself: Nightwing.

Book Four: Batman becomes angrier and more driven because of Dick's departure – his new partner, Batgirl, is concerned over his change in personality. One night, while on the trail of Two-Face, Batman saves young Tim Drake, son of petty criminal "Shifty" Drake. Shifty was trying to stop Two-Face from holding Gotham City ransom prior to his death (his body was found in Metropolis), and Tim seeks to honor his father's dying wish. Batman trained Tim into Robin to save him from a life of crime. Two-Face was captured and Batman took in Tim as his second ward.

Book Five: Dick joins an expedition to find a group of Tibetan monks who have lost an artifact, agreeing to recover the artifact in exchange for their secret of flight (the winged costume). He succeeds in gaining the artifact back from Ra's al Ghul. Succeeding, he visits Batman and reveals his new identity of Nightwing to him, Alfred, Batgirl, and Robin.

Batman: Gotham Adventures (1998–2003)
A new series based on The New Batman Adventures titled Batman: Gotham Adventures ran for 60 issues. This was the longest-running series in the Batman Adventures line. Early issues were written by Ty Templeton and illustrated by Rick Burchett, while the team of Scott Peterson, Tim Levins, and Terry Beatty did most of the later issues. Batgirl and Nightwing appeared in most of the later issues. This series received a lot of positive reviews and was praised for its level of characterization.

Batman Adventures (vol. 2, 2003–2004)
In 2003, DC Comics launched Batman Adventures, shortly after the cancellation of Batman: Gotham Adventures. The first issue was made available through regular purchases and Free Comic Book Day (May 3, 2003). It ran for 17 issues before being canceled to make way for The Batman Strikes!, a new title based on the new, unrelated, animated series The Batman. Every issue had two stories, one by Dan Slott and Ty Templeton, while the other was by Ty Templeton and Rick Burchett.

Issue #15, written by Jason Hall, bridges the gap between Mr. Freeze's appearances in Batman: The Animated Series and Batman Beyond. Issue #17 ends the series with Batman confronting Joe Chill, the man who murdered his parents, although he is unaware of Chill's true identity.

Original plan for Batman Adventures #15
The issue would have been a prequel to the Batman Beyond episode "Meltdown". Warren Powers, head of Powers Technology, acquires Mr. Freeze's head and places it insides his vault. Warren Powers is the father of Derek Powers.

The issue would also have shown the Mr. Freeze robot killing Ferris Boyle (from the Batman: The Animated Series episode "Heart of Ice") and Grant Walker (from the episode "Deep Freeze" and from Batman: Gotham Adventures #5). Other differences include Nora's visit with Koonak (from Batman & Mr. Freeze: SubZero) happening earlier in the issue, as well as focus on the deterioration of Nightwing and Batgirl's relationship.

The Red Hood
The Red Hood appears at the end of Batman Adventures vol. 2, #8. The creative team behind the story (Dan Slott and Ty Templeton) had hoped for a chance to resolve the subplot, but then the series was canceled. This version of Red Hood was supposed to be someone crucial to the DC animated universe. Slott revealed that Andrea Beaumont's mother had faked her death in the movie. He also mentioned that the background of the character would tie into subplots concerning Lucius Fox, the Valestra crime family (from Batman: Mask of the Phantasm), and the Powers family (including an infant Derek Powers from Batman Beyond). Several years later, the 2020 miniseries The Batman Adventures Continue, drawn by Templeton, introduced the Jason Todd version of The Red Hood into the DCAU continuity.

DC Classics: The Batman Adventures (2020)
To coincide with Batman: The Adventures Continue series (see below), DC published an ongoing monthly all-ages reprint series titled DC Classics: The Batman Adventures starting with the reprinting of The Batman Adventures (vol. 1) issue #1, until the series ended with issue #7 (collecting The Batman Adventures (vol. 1) issue #7). Each issue had a US $1.99 cover price. The series ran from June 2020 to December 2020 (cover dated Aug. 2020 - Feb. 2021).

DC Classics: The Batman Adventures #1 (2020-06-09): Reprint of The Batman Adventures #1 (Penguin's Big Score).
DC Classics: The Batman Adventures #2 (2020-07-07): Reprint of The Batman Adventures #2 (Catwoman's Killer Caper).

Batman: The Adventures Continue (2020)

Batman: The Adventures Continue is a continuation of Batman: The Animated Series and its follow-up The New Batman Adventures. The book is co-written by Paul Dini and Alan Burnett, producers of the original animated television series, and illustrated by Ty Templeton, who also worked on previous comics inspired by Batman: TAS. The limited series was initially released as a "digital first" comic, beginning in April 2020. The miniseries lasted eight issues. In March 2021, DC announced Season II of the series, with Issue 1 published in June 2021. As of June 2021, DC has planned seven issues for Season II.

Additional characters
While there were many characters who never appeared in Batman: The Animated Series, the Batman Adventures series would occasionally introduce and feature characters who never made it to the screen.

Heroes and others
 Alec Holland
 Batman Adventures #16 (September 2004)
 Huntress (Appeared in Justice League TV Series)
 The Batman and Robin Adventures #19 (June 1997)
 Julie Madison
 Batman Adventures #1–2, 5 (June–July, October 2003)
 Phantom Stranger
 Batman: Gotham Adventures #33 (February 2001)
 Eel O'Brian 
 Batman Adventures #6 (November 2003)

Villains

 Anarky
 The Batman Adventures #31 (April 1995)
 Black Mask
 Batman Adventures #5–8 (October 2003 – January 2004)
 Black Spider
 Batman Adventures #5–8 (October 2003 – January 2004)
 Bronze Tiger
 Batman Adventures #5–8 (October 2003 – January 2004)
 Cavalier
 Batman Adventures #1 (June 2003)
 Copperhead (Appeared in Justice League (TV series)
 Batman Adventures #13 (June 2004)
 Deadshot (Appeared in Justice League TV series)
 Batman Adventures #5 (October 2003)
 Gorilla Boss
 Batman Adventures #5–8 (October 2003 – January 2004)
 Joe Chill (his only full appearance outside the various flashbacks)
 Batman Adventures #17 (October 2004)
 Killer Moth 
 Batman Adventures #12 (May 2004)
 Red Hood
 Batman Adventures #8 (January 2004)
 Sportsmaster (Has cameo in Justice League TV Series)
 Batman Adventures #5–8 (October 2003 – January 2004)

Collected editions

English version by DC Comics

English/Spanish version by Berlitz Publishing
The Learn Spanish with Batman series includes relettered speech bubbles, with over 300 Spanish words and phrases in red replacing the original text. Outside the comic panels frame, the replaced Spanish and the correspoding English texts are printed at the page border, but the English texts do not necessarily matching the ones in original publications. The Aprende Ingles Con Batman versions are in English text.

Spanish version by OVNI Press

See also
 List of DC Comics publications
 Superman Adventures
 Adventures in the DC Universe/Justice League Adventures/Justice League Unlimited

References

External links
DC pages: BA2003
World's Finest Online
The Batman Adventures
Batman Adventures Comic Books 
The Batman and Robin Adventures
Gotham Adventures
Batman Adventures
Batman Adventures Tribute

Works based on Batman: The Animated Series
Comics based on television series
Comics by Paul Dini
Batman titles
Eisner Award winners
DC Animated Universe comics